The Hampton Inn Court at the Steinke Physical Education Center (SPEC) is home to A&M-Kingsville Javelinas basketball and volleyball. The building was named in honor of Gil Steinke, a former athletic director and football coach at Texas A&M-Kingsville, he is in the College Football Hall of Fame.

References

Basketball venues in Texas
College basketball venues in the United States
College volleyball venues in the United States
Indoor arenas in Texas
Volleyball venues in Texas